Cartago is a canton in the Cartago province of Costa Rica. The head city is Cartago.

History 
Cartago was created on 7 December 1848 by decree 167.

Geography 
Cartago has an area of  km² and a mean elevation of  metres.

Cartago is a T-shaped canton stretching southeast from its capital city to encompass a thin swatch of the Cordillera de Talamanca (Talamanca Mountain Range), and including portions of the Interamericana (Pan-American Highway).

Districts 
The canton of Cartago is subdivided into the following districts:
 Oriental
 Occidental
 Carmen
 San Nicolás
 Aguacaliente
 Guadalupe
 Corralillo
 Tierra Blanca
 Dulce Nombre
 Llano Grande
 Quebradilla

Demographics 

For the 2011 census, Cartago had a population of  inhabitants.

Transportation

Road transportation 
The canton is covered by the following road routes:

Rail transportation 
The Interurbano Line operated by Incofer goes through this canton.

References 

Cantons of Cartago Province
Populated places in Cartago Province